Aquaparamyxovirus is a genus of viruses in the family Paramyxoviridae, order Mononegavirales. The genus includes two species. Fish serve as the natural hosts for AsaPV, in which the virus may cause proliferative gill inflammation.

Taxonomy
The genus contains the following species:

 Oncorhynchus aquaparamyxovirus
 Salmo aquaparamyxovirus

Structure
Viruses of the genus Aquaparamyxovirus produce virions that are enveloped, with spherical geometries. The diameter is around 150 nm. Genomes are linear, around 17 kb in length. The genome codes for 9 proteins.

Life cycle
Viral replication is cytoplasmic. Entry into the host cell is achieved by attachment to host cell surface receptors through HN glycoprotein. Fusion with the plasma membrane; ribonucleocapsid is released in the cytoplasm. Sequential transcription, viral mRNAs are capped and polyadenylated in the cytoplasm. Replication presumably starts when enough nucleoprotein is present to encapsidate neo-synthesized antigenomes and genomes. The ribonucleocapsid binds to the matrix protein and buds via the host ESCRT complexes occurs at the plasma membrane host receptors, which mediates endocytosis. Replication follows the negative stranded RNA virus replication model. Negative stranded RNA virus transcription, using polymerase stuttering is the method of transcription. Translation takes place by leaky scanning. The virus exits the host cell by budding.  Fish serve as the natural host.

References

External links
 ICTV Report: Paramyxoviridae
 Viralzone: Aquaparamyxovirus

Paramyxoviridae
Virus genera